Carl Alvin Scheib (January 1, 1927 – March 24, 2018) was a professional baseball player, a right-handed pitcher for the Philadelphia Athletics (1943–45 and 1947–54) and St. Louis Cardinals (1954) of Major League Baseball (MLB).

Biography
Born in Gratz, Pennsylvania, Scheib led the American League in wild pitches with 9 in 1950. He was one of the best-hitting pitchers of his time. 

In 1948, he registered 31 hits in 104 at bats, for a batting average of .298 with two home runs and 21 runs batted in. He appeared in 32 games as a pitcher, and 20 more as a pinch hitter. 

In 1951, Scheib appeared in 46 games as a pitcher, two more as a pinch hitter, and batted .396 (21 for 53). His .396 mark was the highest for a pitcher with that many at bats since 1925.

During his MLB career, Scheib batted an even .250, with five home runs, 59 RBI and 117 hits in 468 at bats. In 11 seasons, Scheib had a 45–65 win–loss record, in 267 games, with 107 games started, 47 complete games, 17 saves, 1,070 innings pitched, 290 strikeouts, and a 4.88 ERA.

When Scheib made his first appearance in 1943 at age 16, he was the youngest player in the modern era until Joe Nuxhall debuted with the Cincinnati Reds the following season. Scheib remains the youngest player in American League history. A biography of Scheib entitled "Wonder Boy – The Story of Carl Scheib: The Youngest Player in American League History" by Lawrence Knorr was released May 26, 2016. It was published by Sunbury Press.

References

External links

1927 births
2018 deaths
American people of German descent
Baseball players from Pennsylvania
Major League Baseball pitchers
People from Dauphin County, Pennsylvania
Philadelphia Athletics players
Portland Beavers players
St. Louis Cardinals players
San Antonio Missions players